Les Moss is an American football coach and current head coach of the Northern Arizona Wranglers in the Indoor Football League (IFL). He was the head coach of the Jacksonville Sharks of the Arena Football League (AFL) from 2010 to 2016 and the assistant head coach of the Albany Empire of the AFL from 2018 to 2019. He was the head coach of the IFL's Iowa Barnstormers for the 2021 season. He is the son of former NFL, AFL, CFL and NCAA head football coach Perry Moss, who is enshrined in the AFL Hall of Fame.

Early life 
Moss grew up in Lexington, Kentucky, until he was in eighth grade when his family moved to Poca, West Virginia, where he attended Poca High School. He was a member of the football team playing offensive end.

Career 

Moss was head coach of the Wilkes-Barre/Scranton Pioneers of Af2, where he was Coach of the year. In 2010, Moss was named AFL Coach of the Year after compiling a 12–4 record with the Jacksonville Sharks in their inaugural season. On October 4, 2012, The Sharks announced that Moss had been re-signed through the 2014 season. He was fired by the Sharks on July 18, 2016 after a 5-9 start to the season. He was tight ends coach for the XFL's Orlando Rage.

On November 28, 2017, Moss was named the assistant head coach of the AFL 2018 expansion team, the Albany Empire. He was with the Empire in their 2019 season when they won ArenaBowl XXXII. The entire league ceased operations after that season.

In 2021, he was named the head coach of the Iowa Barnstormers of the Indoor Football League. The Barnstormers finished 6–6 and were eliminated in the first round of the playoffs. Moss was released in September 2021. He was then hired by the IFL's Northern Arizona Wranglers as head coach for the 2022 season.

AFL head coaching record

References

External links
Team bio

UCF Knights football players
Chicago Bruisers coaches
Orlando Rage coaches
Living people
Year of birth missing (living people)
Players of American football from Lexington, Kentucky
Players of American football from West Virginia
Sportspeople from Lexington, Kentucky
People from Poca, West Virginia
Massachusetts Marauders coaches
Orlando Predators coaches
Jacksonville Sharks coaches
Wilkes-Barre/Scranton Pioneers coaches
Albany Empire (AFL) coaches